Grigoriy Vasilyevich Soroka (real surname Vasilyev (Васильев); —) was a Russian painter, one of the most notable members of Venetsianov school.

Life 
Soroka was born as a serf in Pokrovskoye village (Tver Guberniya), owned by the Milyukov family. In 1842-1847 he studied art from Alexey Venetsianov then he was returned to his owner. In the 1850s-1860s he resided in his home village. He fell in love with his owner's daughter Lydia but was forcibly married to a serf woman. After the emancipation reform of 1861 in Russia, Soroka remained under the serfdom system. He made a formal complaint but it was rejected and he was flogged. Soroka's body was found in the baking room where he had hanged himself. His beloved Lydia poisoned herself soon after.

Art 
Though Soroka's surviving output is relatively small and includes no more than 20 undated paintings, Soroka proved himself to be a gifted draughtsman. He also painted several icons for local churches, among them Saviour Not Made by Hands.

References

Further reading 
  Обухов, В. Григорий Сорока. М., 1982

19th-century painters from the Russian Empire
Russian male painters
Artists who committed suicide
1823 births
1864 deaths
Suicides by hanging in Russia
People from Tver Oblast
1860s suicides
19th-century male artists from the Russian Empire